Luigi Coppa (born 25 September 1950) is an Italian gymnast. He competed in eight events at the 1972 Summer Olympics.

References

1950 births
Living people
Italian male artistic gymnasts
Olympic gymnasts of Italy
Gymnasts at the 1972 Summer Olympics
Sportspeople from Turin